Eli Bridge Company is a family-owned amusement ride manufacturer headquartered in Jacksonville, Illinois, U.S.

History
W. E. Sullivan, the owner of Eli Bridge Company in Illinois, rode the original 1893 Chicago Ferris Wheel at the World's Columbian Exposition. Inspired by this, he later collaborated with machinist James H. Clements and their first "Big Eli" wheel debuted in Central Park, Jacksonville, Illinois, on May 23, 1900. In 1955, Eli Bridge Co. produced its first non-wheel amusement ride, the Scrambler. Eli Bridge products can be found in amusement parks around the world. Today, Eli Bridge remains a family-owned company. Lee Sullivan, chairman of the board, is the grandson of company founder W. E. Sullivan, and President/CEO Patty Sullivan is the great granddaughter of W. E. Sullivan.

Ferris wheels
Signature Series: 16 cars, 3 passengers per car; transportable
Eagle Series: 16 cars, 3 passengers per car; transportable
HY-5 Series: 12 cars, 3 passengers per car; transportable
Aristocrat Series: 16 cars, fixed site
Standard Series: 12 cars, fixed site
Lil' Wheel: 6 cars, 3 passengers per car; transportable and fixed site models

Scramblers
Next Generation Series: mobile
Standard Series: fixed site
Lil' Scrambler: 12 seat mobile or fixed site

Family rides
Construction Zone: mobile & fixed site
SpiderMania: mobile and fixed site

Further reading 

 "Eli Bridge Co. Rides High Thanks to Wheels of Fortune," Jessy Yancey, Illinois Farm Bureau Partners
 "Big Eli, The First Portable Ferris Wheel (May 23, 1900)," Clint Cargile, 24 May 2021, Northern Public Radio
 "Points of Interest: Eli Bridge Company... Manufacturing fun," Jeff Mondlock, 8 July 2013, KHQA

References

Amusement ride manufacturers
Companies based in Morgan County, Illinois
Jacksonville, Illinois micropolitan area
Manufacturing companies based in Illinois
Family-owned companies of the United States